Les Roberts may refer to:

Les Roberts (mystery novel writer) (born 1937), American mystery novel writer
Les Roberts (epidemiologist) (born 1961), American epidemiologist
Les Roberts (footballer) (1901–1980), English football inside forward
Les Roberts (wrestler) Australian professional wrestler

See also
Leslie Roberts (born 1962), Canadian journalist
Le Robert
Dictionnaires Le Robert
Roberts (disambiguation)
Robert (disambiguation)